Muay Thai, sometimes referred to as Thai boxing, is a combat sport that uses stand-up striking along with various clinching techniques. This discipline is known as the "art of eight limbs", as it is characterised by the combined use of fists, elbows, knees and shins. Muay Thai became widespread internationally in the late 20th to 21st century, when Westernised practitioners from Thailand began competing in kickboxing and mixed-rules matches as well as matches under muay Thai rules around the world. The professional league is governed by The Professional Boxing Association of Thailand (P.A.T), sanctioned by The Sports Authority of Thailand (S.A.T.).

Muay Thai is related to other martial art styles such as Musti-yuddha,  Adimurai, Muay Chaiya, Muay Boran, Muay Lao, Lethwei and Tomoi. A practitioner of muay Thai is known as a Nak Muay. Western practitioners in Thailand are sometimes called Nak Muay Farang, meaning "Foreign boxer".

History 

The origin of Muay Thai is subject to scholarly debates, however, few sources believed that Muay Thai is originated from Bokator which even predated the Angkorian period.

Many sources confirmed that Muay Thai is an ancient form of unarmed combat that originated in Thailand. It is believed to have been developed by the Siamese army as a form of self-defence and it can be traced at least to the 16th century as a peace-time martial art practised by the soldiers of King Naresuan. An exhibition of Muay Thai was observed and reported by Simon de la Loubère, a French diplomat who was sent by King Louis XIV to the Kingdom of Siam in 1687, in his famous work and the Ayutthaya Kingdom Burmese–Siamese War (1765–1767) Muay boran, and therefore Muay Thai, was originally called by more generic names such as Toi Muay or simply Muay. As well as being a practical fighting technique for use in actual warfare, Muay became a sport in which the opponents fought in front of spectators who went to watch for entertainment. These Muay contests gradually became an integral part of local festivals and celebrations, especially those held at temples. Eventually, the previously bare-fisted fighters started wearing lengths of hemp rope around their hands and forearms. This type of match was called Muay Khat Chueak (มวยคาดเชือก)

19th century

The ascension of King Chulalongkorn (Rama V) to the throne in 1868 ushered in a golden age not only for Muay but for the whole country of Thailand. Muay progressed greatly during the reign of Rama V as a direct result of the king's personal interest in the sport. The country was at peace and Muay functioned as a means of physical exercise, self-defense, attacking, recreation and personal advancement.

The modern era
1909-1910: King Chulalongkorn formalized Muay Boran ("ancient boxing") by awarding (in 1910) three Muen to victors at the funeral fights for his son (in 1909). The region style: Lopburi, Korat and Chaiya.

1913: British boxing was introduced into the curriculum of the Suan Kulap College. The first descriptive use of the term "Muay Thai".

1919: British boxing and Muay Thai were taught as one sport in the curriculum of the Suan Kulap College. Judo was also offered.

1921: First permanent ring in Siam at Suan Kulap College. Used for both muay and British boxing.

1923: Suan Sanuk Stadium. First international style three-rope ring with red and blue padded corners, near Lumpinee Park. Muay and British boxing.

King Rama VII (r. 1925–1935) pushed for codified rules for Muay and they were put into place. Thailand's first boxing ring was built in 1921 at Suan Kulap. Referees were introduced and rounds were now timed by kick. Fighters at the Lumpinee Boxing Stadium began wearing modern gloves, as well as hard groin protectors, during training and in boxing matches against foreigners. Traditional rope-binding (Khat Chueak) made the hands a hardened, dangerous striking tool. The use of knots in the rope over the knuckles made the strikes more abrasive and damaging for the opponent while protecting the hands of the fighter. This rope-binding was still used in fights between Thais but after a death in the ring, it was decided that fighters should wear gloves and cotton coverlets over the feet and ankles. It was also around this time that the term "Muay Thai" became commonly used, while the older form of the style came to be known as "Muay Boran", which is now performed primarily as an exhibition art form.

Muay Thai was at the height of its popularity in the 1980s and 1990s. Top fighters commanded purses of up to 200,000 Baht and the stadia where gambling was legal drew big gates and big advertising revenues. In 2016, a payout to a superstar fighter was about 100,000Bbaht per fight, but can range as high as 540,000 Baht for a bout.

In 1993, the International Federation of Muay Thai Amateur, or IFMA was inaugurated. It became the governing body of amateur Muay Thai consisting of 128 member countries worldwide and is recognised by the Olympic Council of Asia.

In 1995, the World Muaythai Council, the oldest and largest professional sanctioning organisations of muay Thai, was established by the Thai government and sanctioned by the Sports Authority of Thailand.

In 1995, the World Muay Thai Federation was founded by the merger of two existing organisations, and established in Bangkok, becoming the federation governing international Muay Thai. In August 2012, it had over 70 member countries. Its president is elected at the World Muay Thai Congress.

In 2006, Muay Thai was included in SportAccord with IFMA. One of the requirements of SportAccord was that no sport can have a name of a country in its name. As a result, an amendment was made in the IFMA constitution to change the name of the sport from "Muay Thai" to "Muaythai"  —written as one word in accordance with Olympic requirements.

In 2014, Muay Thai was included in the International World Games Association (IWGA) and was represented in the official programme of The World Games 2017 in Wrocław, Poland.

In January 2015, Muay Thai was granted the patronage of the International University Sports Federation (FISU) and, from 16 to 23 March 2015, the first University World Muaythai Cup was held in Bangkok.

In 2020, there are more than 3,800 Thai boxing gyms overseas.

Rules
According to IFMA rules and regulations, Muay Thai is a martial art that uses every part of the body's limbs, therefore allowing for strikes including the fists, legs, knees and elbows.

Generally, for a strike to count towards the point score, it has to hit without being blocked or guarded against by the opponent. Strikes also do not score if they hit the opponent's glove, forearm, foot, or shin. Strikes to the groin are against the rules and if found to be intentional are counted as fouls.

If both Muay Thai fighters have the same score at the end of the round, the winner is determined by which fighter has the more powerful strike.

Olympics 
Timeline of International Federation of Muaythai Associations (IFMA) from founding to International Olympic Committee (IOC) recognition:

 1992 – National Federation of Muaythai Associations founded.
 1995 – International Amateur Muay Thai Federation (IAMTF) founded.
 2012 – Official request for International Olympic Committee (IOC) recognition launched.
 2016 – First endorsement received.
 2017 – Muaythai is included in the World Games.
 2021 – On June 10, the IOC Board of Directors agreed on the full endorsement of IFMA at the 138th IOC General Assembly in Tokyo.
 2021 – On July 20, the IOC General Assembly granted full recognition to the International Federation of Muaythai Associations (IFMA) and Muaythai.
 2023 - On January 11, USA MuayThai has been officially approved by The United States Olympic and Paralympic Committee (USOPC) and was recognized by the organization’s committee as the newest member with a chance to build on the 2028 Olympic in the United States.
 2023 - The European Olympic Committees (EOC) had officially announced the inclusion of Muay Thai, or Thai-style boxing, at the 2023 European Games to be held in Krakow, Poland.

Traditional wear

The mongkhon, or mongkol (headband), and pra jiad (armbands) are often worn into the ring before the match begins. They originated when Siam was in a constant state of war. Young men would tear off pieces of a loved one's clothing (often a mother's sarong) and wear it in battle for good luck as well as to ward off harmful spirits. In modern times, the mongkol (lit. "holy spirit", "luck", "protection") is worn as a tribute to the fighter's gym. The mongkol is traditionally presented by a trainer to the fighter when he judges that the fighter is ready to represent the gym in the ring. Often, after the fighter has finished the wai kru, the trainer will take the mongkol off his head and place it in his corner of the ring for luck. They were also used for protection. Whether the fighter is a Buddhist or not, it is common for them to bring the mongkol to a Buddhist monk who blesses it for good luck prior to stepping into the ring.

Techniques
Formal muay Thai techniques are divided into two groups: mae mai (แม่ไม้), or "major techniques", and luk mai (ลูกไม้), or "minor techniques". Muay Thai is often a fighting art of attrition, where opponents exchange blows with one another. This is certainly the case with traditional stylists in Thailand, but is a less popular form of fighting in the contemporary world fighting circuit where the Thai style of exchanging blow for blow is no longer favorable. Almost all techniques in muay Thai use the entire body movement, rotating the hip with each kick, punch, elbow and block.

Punching (Chok)

The punch techniques in muay Thai were originally quite limited, being crosses and a long (or lazy) circular strike made with a straight (but not locked) arm and landing with the heel of the palm. Cross-fertilisation with Western boxing and Western martial arts mean the full range of western boxing punches are now used: lead jab, straight/cross, hook, uppercut, shovel and corkscrew punches and overhands, as well as hammer fists and back fists.

As a tactic, body punching is used less in muay Thai than most other striking combat sports to avoid exposing the attacker's head to counter strikes from knees or elbows. To utilize the range of targeting points, in keeping with the centre line theory, the fighter can use either the Western or Thai stance which allows for either long range or short range attacks to be undertaken effectively without compromising guard.

Elbow (Sok)

The elbow can be used in several ways as a striking weapon: horizontal, diagonal-upwards, diagonal-downwards, uppercut, downward, backward-spinning,and flying. From the side, it can be used as either a finishing move or as a way to cut the opponent's eyebrow so that blood might block his vision. The diagonal elbows are faster than the other forms but are less powerful. The elbow strike is considered the most dangerous form of attack in the sport.

There is a distinct difference between a single elbow and a follow-up elbow. The single elbow is a move independent from any other, whereas a follow-up elbow is the second strike from the same arm, being a hook or straight punch first with an elbow follow-up. Such elbows, and most other elbow strikes, are used when the distance between fighters becomes too small and there is too little space to throw a hook at the opponent's head.

Elbows can be used to great effect as blocks or defences against, for example, spring knees, side body knees, body kicks or punches. When well connected, an elbow strike can cause serious damage to the opponent, including cuts or even a knockout.

Kicking (Te)

The two most common kicks in muay Thai are known as the thip (literally "foot jab") and the te chiang (kicking upwards in the shape of a triangle cutting under the arm and ribs), or roundhouse kick. The Thai roundhouse kick uses a rotational movement of the entire body and has been widely adopted by practitioners of other combat sports. It is done from a circular stance with the back leg just a little ways back (roughly shoulder width apart) in comparison to instinctive upper body fighting (boxing) where the legs must create a wider base. The roundhouse kick draws its power almost entirely from the rotational movement of the hips, counter-rotation of the shoulders and arms are also often used to add torque to the lower body and increase the power of the kick as well.

If a roundhouse kick is attempted by the opponent, the Thai boxer will normally check the kick, that is, he will block the kick with the outside of his lower leg. Thai boxers are trained to always connect with the shin. The foot contains many fine bones and is much weaker. A fighter may end up hurting himself if he tries to strike with his foot or instep. Shins are trained by repeatedly striking firm objects, such as pads or heavy bags.

Knee (Ti Khao)

Khao dot  (Jumping knee strike) – the boxer jumps up on one leg and strikes with that leg's knee.
Khao loi (Flying knee strike) – the boxer takes a step(s), jumps forward and off one leg and strikes with that leg's knee.
Khao thon  (Straight knee strike) – the boxer simply thrusts it forward but not upwards, unless he is holding an opponent's head down in a clinch and intend to knee upwards into the face. According to one written source, this technique is somewhat more recent than khao dot or khao loi. Supposedly, when the Thai boxers fought with rope-bound hands rather than the modern boxing gloves, this particular technique was subject to potentially vicious cutting, slicing and sawing by an alert opponent who would block it or deflect it with the sharp "rope-glove" edges which are sometimes dipped in water to make the rope much stronger. This explanation also holds true for some of the following knee strikes below as well.

Foot-thrust (Teep)

The foot-thrust, or literally, "foot jab", is one of the techniques in muay Thai. It is mainly used as a defensive technique to control distance or block attacks. Foot-thrusts should be thrown quickly but with enough force to knock an opponent off balance.

Clinch and neck wrestling (Chap kho)

In Western boxing, the two fighters are separated when they clinch; in muay Thai, however, they are not. It is often in the clinch that knee and elbow techniques are used. To strike and bind the opponent for both offensive and defensive purposes, small amounts of stand-up grappling are used in the clinch. The front clinch should be performed with the palm of one hand on the back of the other. There are three reasons why the fingers must not be intertwined. 1) In the ring fighters are wearing boxing gloves and cannot intertwine their fingers. 2) The Thai front clinch involves pressing the head of the opponent downwards, which is easier if the hands are locked behind the back of the head instead of behind the neck. Furthermore, the arms should be putting as much pressure on the neck as possible. 3) A fighter may incur an injury to one or more fingers if they are intertwined, and it becomes more difficult to release the grip in order to quickly elbow the opponent's head.

A correct clinch also involves the fighter's forearms pressing against the opponent's collar bone while the hands are around the opponent's head rather than the opponent's neck. The general way to get out of a clinch is to push the opponent's head backward or elbow them, as the clinch requires both participants to be very close to one another. Additionally, the non-dominant clincher can try to "swim" their arm underneath and inside the opponent's clinch, establishing the previously non-dominant clincher as the dominant clincher.

Muay Thai has several other variants of the clinch or chap kho , including:
Arm clinch: One or both hands controls the inside of the defender's arm(s) and where the second hand if free is in the front clinch position. This clinch is used to briefly control the opponent before applying a knee strike or throw.
Side clinch: One arm passes around the front of the defender with the attacker's shoulder pressed into the defender's arm pit and the other arm passing round the back which allows the attacker to apply knee strikes to the defender's back or to throw the defender readily.
Low clinch: Both controlling arms pass under the defender's arms, which is generally used by the shorter of two opponents.
Swan-neck: One hand around the rear of the neck is used to briefly clinch an opponent before a strike.

Defence against attacks

Defences in muay Thai are categorised in six groups:

Blocking – defender's hard blocks to stop a strike in its path so preventing it reaching its target (e.g. the shin block described in more detail below)
 Parry/Block – Parrying or blocking uses the kickboxer's hands as defensive tools to deflect incoming attacks. As the opponent's punch arrives, the boxer delivers a sharp, lateral, open-handed blow to the opponent's wrist or forearm, redirecting the punch.
Avoidance – moving a body part out of the way or range of a strike so the defender remains in range for a counter-strike. For example, the defender moves their front leg backward to avoid the attacker's low kick, then immediately counters with a roundhouse kick. Or the defender might lay their head back from the attacker's high roundhouse kick then counter-attack with a side kick.
Evasion – moving the body out of the way or range of a strike so the defender has to move close again to counter-attack, e.g. defender jumping laterally or back from attacker's kicks
Disruption – Pre-empting an attack e.g. with defender using disruptive techniques like jab, foot-thrust or low roundhouse kick, generally called a "leg kick" (to the outside or inside of the attacker's front leg, just above the knee) as the attacker attempts to close distance
Anticipation – Defender catching a strike (e.g., catching a roundhouse kick to the body) or countering it before it lands (e.g., defender's low kick to the supporting leg below as the attacker initiates a high roundhouse kick).

Defences in practice
Defensively, the concept of "wall of defence" is used, in which shoulders, arms and legs are used to hinder the attacker from successfully executing techniques. Blocking is a critical element in muay Thai and compounds the level of conditioning a successful practitioner must possess. Low and mid body roundhouse kicks are normally blocked with the upper portion of a raised shin (this block is known as a "check"). High body strikes are blocked ideally with the forearms and shoulder together, or if enough time is allowed for a parry, the glove (elusively), elbow, or shin will be used. Midsection roundhouse kicks can also be caught/trapped, allowing for a sweep or counter-attack to the remaining leg of the opponent. Punches are blocked with an ordinary boxing guard and techniques similar, if not identical, to basic boxing technique. A common means of blocking a punch is using the hand on the same side as the oncoming punch. For example, if an orthodox fighter throws a jab (being the left hand), the defender will make a slight tap to redirect the punch's angle with the right hand. The deflection is always as small and precise as possible to avoid unnecessary energy expenditure and return the hand to the guard as quickly as possible. Hooks are often blocked with a motion sometimes described as "combing the hair", that is, raising the elbow forward and effectively shielding the head with the forearm, flexed biceps and shoulder. More advanced muay Thai blocks are usually in the form of counter-strikes, using the opponent's weight (as they strike) to amplify the damage that the countering opponent can deliver. This requires impeccable timing and thus can generally only be learned by many repetitions.

Child boxers

In 2016, 9,998 children under the age of 15 were registered with Board of Boxing under the Sport Authority of Thailand, according to the Child Safety Promotion and Injury Prevention Research Centre (CSIP). Some estimates put the number of child boxers nationwide at between 200,000 and 300,000, some as young as four years old.

The Advanced Diagnostic Imaging Centre (AIMC) at Ramathibodi Hospital studied 300 child boxers aged under 15 with two to more than five years of experience, as well as 200 children who do not box. The findings show that child boxers not only sustain brain injuries, they also have a lower IQ, about 10 points lower than average levels. Moreover, IQ levels correlate with the length of their training. Beyond brain damage, the death of young fighters in the ring sometimes occurs.

Adisak Plitapolkarnpim, director of CSIP, was indirectly quoted (in 2016) as having said that muay Thai practitioners "younger than 15 years old are being urged to avoid 'head contact' to reduce the risk of brain injuries, while children aged under nine should be banned from the combat fight"; furthermore, the Boxing Act's minimum age to compete professionally was largely being flouted; furthermore, quoted indirectly, "Boxers aged between 13 and 15" should still be permitted to compete, but "with light contact to the head and face". He said that "spectators and a change in the boxing rules can play a vital role in preventing child boxers from suffering brain injuries, abnormality in brain structure, Parkinson's disease and early-onset Alzheimer's later in life...Children aged between nine and 15 can take part in [Thai] boxing, but direct head contact must not be allowed". Referring to Findings [of 2014] on the Worst Forms of Child Labour as published by the US Department of Labor's Bureau of International Labor Affairs, he said, "We know Muay Thai paid fighters have been exploited in the past like child labourers and the matter still remains a serious concern."

At the 13th World Conference on Injury Prevention and Safety Promotion in 2018, it was revealed that up to three percent of the upcoming generation will grow up with learning disabilities unless an amendment is ratified that bans children under 12 from participating in boxing matches. International pediatricians have called on lawmakers in Thailand to help.

Injuries
Muay Thai is a combat sport that utilises eight different parts of the body (fists, elbows, knees and shins) so injuries are quite common in all levels of muay Thai. An injury is considered reportable if it requires the athlete to rest for more than one day. Many injuries in the sport go unreported as the fighters may not notice the injuries at first, refuse to admit that they need treatment, have a heightened pain threshold, fear that their instructor will perceive the injury negatively, or have confusion as to what is an injury. Similar to most sports, injury rates tend to be higher in beginners than amateurs and professionals. Soft tissue injuries are the most common form of injury in muay Thai, comprising between 80 and 90% of all injuries. These injuries are caused by repeated trauma to soft parts of the body. During matches there is little to no padding, leaving soft tissue vulnerable to strikes. The second most common injuries among beginners and amateurs are sprains and strains. It appears that these injuries can be easily avoided or reduced. Many participants of a study admitted to inadequate warm up before the event of the injury. The third most common injuries are fractures. Fractures are more commonly seen with amateur and professional fighters, because they are allowed full contact, while beginners are not. The most common sites for fractures are the nose, carpal bones, metacarpals, digits and ribs. The distribution of injuries differs significantly for beginners, amateurs and professionals, because as a fighter progresses through the different levels, the forces involved grow progressively higher, less padding and protective equipment is used, and athletes are likely to train harder, resulting in more serious injuries among experienced fighters.

Gambling 

According to a Bangkok Post columnist, "...Thai professional boxing is all about gambling and big money. Gambling on muay Thai boxing is estimated to worth about 40 billion baht a year....all the talk about the promotion of Thai martial arts is just baloney." Rob Cox, the manager of a boxing camp just east of Bangkok claims that "Without the gamblers, the sport would pretty much be dead. They're killing it off, but they’re also keeping it alive".

The practice of fixing fights is not unknown. Boxers can earn from 60,000 to 150,000 baht for purposefully losing a fight. A fighter, later arrested, who threw a fight at Rajadamnern Stadium in December 2019, is an example. An infamous alleged case of match-fixing was the bout on 12 October 2014 in Pattaya between top Thai boxer Buakaw Banchamek and his challenger, Enriko Kehl, at the K-1 World Max Final event.

Folklore
An urban legend started being told by Thai people in 1767 around the time of the fall of the ancient Siamese capital of Ayutthaya, when the invading Burmese troops rounded up thousands of Siamese citizens. They then organised a seven-day, seven-night religious festival in honour of Buddha's relics. The festivities included many forms of entertainment, such as costume plays, comedies and sword fighting matches. According to the folklore story, at one point, King Mangra wanted to see how Thai fighters would compare to his fighters. Nai Khanomtom was selected to fight against the King's chosen champion and the boxing ring was set up in front of the throne.  When the fight began, Nai Khanomtom charged out, using punches, kicks, elbows and knees to pummel his opponent until he collapsed. The King supposedly asked if Nai Khanomtom would fight nine other Burmese champions to prove himself. He agreed and fought one after the other with no rest periods. His last opponent was a great kickboxing teacher from Rakhine State whom Nai Khanomtom defeated with kicks.

King Mangra was so impressed that he allegedly remarked, "Every part of the Siamese is blessed with venom. Even with his bare hands, he can fell nine or ten opponents. But his Lord was incompetent and lost the country to the enemy. If he had been any good, there was no way the City of Ayutthaya would ever have fallen."

To commemorate the story of Nai Khanom Tom, the Muay Thai Festival and Wai Khru Muay Thai Ceremony are staged annually every year on March 17.

Conditioning
Like most full contact fighting sports, muay Thai has a heavy focus on body conditioning. This can create a steep learning curve for newcomers to muay Thai but allows for rapid increases in fitness and stamina provided one avoids overtraining. Training regimens include many staples of combat sport conditioning such as running, shadowboxing, rope jumping, body weight resistance exercises, medicine ball exercises, abdominal exercises and, in some cases, weight training. Thai boxers rely heavily on kicks utilising the shin bone. As such, practitioners will repeatedly hit a dense heavy bag with their shins, conditioning it, hardening the bone through a process called cortical remodelling. Striking a sand-filled bag will have the same effect.

Training specific to a Thai fighter includes training with coaches on Thai pads, focus mitts, heavy bag, and sparring. Daily training includes many rounds (3–5 minute periods broken up by a short rest, often 1–2 minutes) of these various methods of practice. Thai pad training is a cornerstone of muay Thai conditioning that involves practicing punches, kicks, knees, and elbow strikes with a trainer wearing thick pads covering the forearms and hands. These special pads (often referred to as Thai pads) are used to absorb the impact of the fighter's strikes and allow the fighter to react to the attacks of the pad holder in a live situation. The trainer will often also wear a belly pad around the abdominal area so that the fighter can attack with straight kicks or knees to the body at any time during the round.

Focus mitts are specific to training a fighter's hand speed, punch combinations, timing, punching power, defence and counter-punching and may also be used to practice elbow strikes. Heavy bag training is a conditioning and power exercise that reinforces the techniques practiced on the pads. Sparring is a means to test technique, skills, range, strategy and timing against a partner. Sparring is often a light to medium contact exercise because competitive fighters on a full schedule are not advised to risk injury by sparring hard. Specific tactics and strategies can be trained with sparring including in close fighting, clinching and kneeing only, cutting off the ring, or using reach and distance to keep an aggressive fighter away.

Due to the rigorous training regimen (some Thai boxers fight almost every other week), professional boxers in Thailand have relatively short careers in the ring. Many retire from competition to begin instructing the next generation of Thai fighters. Most professional Thai boxers come from lower economic backgrounds, and the purse (after other parties have their cut) is sought as a means of support for the fighters and their families. Very few higher economic strata Thais join the professional muay Thai ranks; they usually either do not practice the sport or practice it only as amateur boxers.

Famous practitioners

See also

Muay Boran
Muay Chaiya
Muay Lerdrit
Wai khru ram muay
Pra Jiad
Mongkhon
Muay Thai in popular culture
Krabi–krabong
Pencak silat

References

Further reading

 Muay Thai The Essential Guide To The Art of Thai Boxing. Tony Moore. New Holland. .

Wei, Lindsey (2020) Path of the Spiritual Warrior: Life and Teachings of Muay Thai Fighter Pedro Solana. Auckland: Purple Cloud Press, 

 
Mixed martial arts styles
Combat sports
Thai sports and games
Sports originating in Thailand